The brown anole (Anolis sagrei), also known commonly as the Cuban brown anole, or De la Sagra's anole, is a species of lizard in the family Dactyloidae. The species is native to Cuba and the Bahamas. It has been widely introduced elsewhere, via the importation and exportation of plants where the anole would lay eggs in the soil of the pots, and is now found in Florida and as far north in the United States as southern Georgia, Texas, Louisiana, Tennessee, Mississippi, Alabama, Hawaii, and Southern California. It has also been introduced to other Caribbean islands, Mexico, and Taiwan.

This species is highly invasive. 
In its introduced range, it reaches exceptionally high population densities, is capable of expanding its range very quickly, and both outcompetes and consumes many species of native lizards, like the green anole.  The brown anole's introduction into the United States in the early 1970s has altered the behavior and negatively affected populations of the native Carolina anole (Anolis carolinensis, also known as the green anole), which have since generally been relegated to the treetops.

Etymology 
The specific name, sagrei, is in honor of Spanish botanist Ramón de la Sagra.

Description 
The brown anole is normally a light brown color with darker brown to black markings on its back, and several tan to light color lines on its sides. Like other anoles, it can change color, in this case a darker brown to black. Its dewlap ranges from yellow to orange-red.

Brown anoles are typically 5.0 to 8.5 inches long. 
The male brown anole's head is smaller than that of the male Carolina                                                                                                                 anole.

The brown anole's tail has a ridge that travels all the way up to behind the head, a feature that the Carolina anole lacks.
Female anolis lizards exhibit heritable polymorphism in their dorsal patterning. A study in Gainesville, Florida reported that one-third of A. sagrei females displayed a male-like chevron dorsal pattern, while other females had a striped dorsal pattern with continuous variation.

Habitat and distribution 
The native range of the brown anole extends over much of the Caribbean, including Jamaica, Cuba, the Cayman Islands, and other countries. Currently, they are considered an invasive species in parts of Florida in the United States, including the Florida Keys, Dade County, Broward County, and Palm Beach County as of 1985. Today, their range has extended as far as Georgia and to parts of Mexico. It is believed that these lizards were unintentionally brought to the area in cargo shipments for the Caribbean, as well as an intentional release of approximately 100 individuals in 1941. The species is also established in parts of Honduras.

The brown anole tends to live on the ground, avoiding trees and preferring to live in smaller plants and shrubs and is found in both urban and suburban areas. When the weather is warm, the brown anole can be found basking. When it is cold, they prefer sheltered areas.  Brown anoles are less arboreal than the green anoles which are frequently found living in trees, on the ground, or in low vegetation.  

Although the brown anole was initially found in the Caribbean and then introduced to southern Florida, the species is now moving north. Specifically, the species has been found in southern Georgia as well as coastal Georgia. Researchers expect that this trend will continue in the coming years and that the brown anole will continue to migrate to other locations in the north. Due to their invasiveness, they are often the dominant reptile species in a given environment.

Conservation 
While the brown anole is an invasive species in the United States, they likely do provide some benefits to their ecosystems. Because they eat predominantly arthropods, they may keep populations of spiders at appropriate levels. Some research suggests that local spider populations depend directly on the population of the brown anole.

In habitats they share with the green anole, the brown anole dominates and shrinks the population of the green anole. They also occasionally eat hatchlings of the green anole, further putting pressure on their populations. No concentrated efforts have been made to mitigate the spread of the brown anole populations in the United States.

Additionally, the brown anole has been shown to be responsible for the transmission of parasites among lizard populations in Hawai'i, which are often deadly for these local populations.

Phylogeny 
The brown anole belongs to the family and genus, Datyloidae and Anolis, respectively. 

The most closely related species to Anolis sagrei is Anolis nelsoni, also called Nelson's anole. 

The brown anole has a shorter snout length than the green anole. The green anole, or Anolis carolinensis, is green or light brown patterned.

Territoriality

Male-male competition 
Studies suggest that male brown anoles exhibit territoriality over ground below perches on which they rest. When the male anole spots other males in his ground territory, he is very likely to put on displays to attempt to intimidate the competitor. If, however, the competitor presents himself on the same perch as the male or at roughly the same height, the male is much more likely to attack the competitor. So, the male brown anole is thought to use his perch to survey his territory, but is not likely to leave the perch to fight off competitors, as doing so would be costly. Additionally, research shows that the success of an individual male anole in competition with another is dependent on his size relative to his competitor. The size of a male also correlates with the height of his perch; that is, larger males are more often found on higher perches and smaller males on lower ones. Different specific confrontational behaviors are also exhibited by differently sized males; larger ones more often initiate conflict and smaller ones more often nod their heads towards larger anoles. The loss of a male brown anole's tail has been shown to have little to no effect on the size of the territory he protects or dominance patterns between male brown anoles.

Habitat migration 
Under certain circumstances, brown anoles leave their current territory and migrate to a new one. Males migrate to new territories in response to male-male competition, with smaller males being more likely to migrate. The distance that a male migrates is negatively correlated with his size relative to other males; large males travel shorter distances to new territories and small males travel longer distances to new territories. Female brown anoles do not show an association between size and probability of migration or migration distance. Instead, females in territories with a high density of other females are more likely to move to territories with lower densities of other females. Generally, individuals, regardless of sex, prefer to remain in their original territory as migrating poses predation risks and energetic costs.

Diet 
Brown anoles feed on small arthropods such as crickets, moths, ants, grasshoppers, cockroaches, mealworms, beetles, flies, earwigs, butterflies, spiders, waxworms, amphipods, and isopods. Brown anoles also feed on other types of invertebrates such as earthworms and snails. They may also eat other lizards, such as skinks, geckos, and the Carolina anole, lizard eggs and hatchlings (including members of their species), and their own molted skin and detached tails. If near water, they eat aquatic arthropods or small fish – nearly any prey that will fit in their mouths. Occasionally, individuals will also consume figs and plant material; it might be interpreted as a hydration mechanism or accidental ingestion.

Reproduction 
In a given habitat, female brown anoles reproduce in the warmer parts of the year. The brood size of a single female brown anole is one egg, which it lays in damp environments. The female lays its eggs roughly 2 weeks apart from each other, resulting in a total of 15 to 18 eggs in a single breeding season. The breeding season of a female extends slightly longer than that of a male, as the female is capable of storing sperm for a short time. When a juvenile anole is born, usually in June, it is completely independent from its parents. Sexual maturation of both males and females occurs within a year of hatching, so an individual can participate in the mating season following its birth.

When a female anole is prepared for mating, it begins by making itself visible to the male whose territory it is in. When mating occurs, the male grabs on to the back on the females neck with its mouth, so prior to mating, a female will bend it's neck such that it is more visible and accessible by the male, indicating that it is ready for procreation. If the male decides to reproduce, it will begin mating with the female, which usually last from 30 to 60 minutes. Males indicate that they are available for mating by extending their dewlap and bobbing their head.

Mating 
Male anoles have a flap that extends below their neck called a "dewlap". Dewlap extension occurs alongside a number of behaviors exhibited by the brown anole, namely during courtship. In an experiment by Richard Tokarz, an experimental group of male brown anoles underwent a surgery that rendered them unable to extend their dewlaps; a control group of male anoles were subject to the same surgery, but without the final step, so they retained the ability to extend their dewlap. Males and females were then put together in an enclosure; the experimental males took more time to begin mating when in the presence of females and mating took longer. Control males were more quick to mate and mated more quickly.

A separate study suggests that the dominant male in a territory is more influential over the mating partners of a female than female mate choice. During observation, females that mated with multiple males did so because dominance over a territory transferred between males, while the female remained in the same territory. There were no observations of female brown anoles seeking out different males or entering a new territory.

Additionally, female brown anoles are more likely to participate in mating behaviors in the presence of precipitation.

Parental care 
An individual egg will hatch four weeks after it was laid. From the moment they are born, the anole is completely independent from its parents. As such, the brown anole displays no reproductive division of labor past the mating event and displays no cooperative brood care. However, female brown anoles have been observed digging holes and positioning eggs within these holes after oviposition. This is thought to allow for additional parental influence on phenotype and offspring survival. The selection of a site to nest by a female and how she lays her eggs within this site is performed in an effort to maximize survival of her offspring. A female will lay one egg at a time and can lay a new egg each week of the reproductive season.

Enemies 
Know predators of the brown anole include broad-headed skinks, snakes, birds, and occasionally other species of anoles. More often than not, brown anoles eaten by other anoles are juvenile. Predation by many vertebrates has been observed. Spiders can prey upon young anoles and are one of the few exceptions to this observation.

Antipredator behavior 
The coloration of the brown anole allows it to easily blend in with its surroundings, making it difficult for predators to spot. The brown anole has a detachable tail that can be detached if the anole is grabbed by the tail by a predator or used as a distraction, as it twitches after detaching. The tail grows back afterwards, albeit smaller and a duller color. Despite the extensive list of predators, the lizard's alertness and sprint speed make it very difficult for predators to track and capture.

Physiology

Hindlimb length 
When raised in terraria with surfaces differing in width (wide or narrow), brown anoles wide-surface terraria grew longer hindlimb than their narrow-surface terraria counterparts. Brown anoles demonstrate phenotypic plasticity in this trait, akin to very rapid evolution.

Toepads 
Extreme climate events such as hurricanes can provoke species changes through natural selection. In areas recently affected by hurricanes, anoles with large, strong-gripping toepads were more successful in surviving. In 12 insular populations of Anolis sagrei, and 188 species from across the Neotropics over the past 70 years, the populations that were more frequently affected by hurricanes had proportionately larger toepads.

Dewlap 
Nearly all species of anole, including the Anolis sagrei, have a dewlap on their throat. The dewlap can be used as a means of identifying specific species within the Dactyloidae family. This is useful for not only mate selection between male anoles, but also to ensure the female is indeed mating with an individual within their own species. The dewlap of the Anolis sagrei is typically a shade of red or yellow, while the rest of an individual is brown. The extension of the dewlap is controlled by the ceratobranchials II, a bone below the throat. The size and color of a species' dewlap has been shown to vary with the light of their environments and color of their body, respectively; specifically, dimmer environments elicit larger dewlaps and duller body colors elicit brighter dewlap colors. In the brown anole, dewlap color is not dependent on an individual's consumption of lutein and zeaxanthin, pigments typically used as colorants in species that display color on their body. Dewlaps are believed to be involved in mate selection, as well as communication between individual brown anoles.

Shedding 
Brown anoles molt in small pieces, unlike some other reptiles, which molt in one large piece. Anoles may consume the molted skin to replenish supplies of calcium. In captivity, the molted skin may stick to the anole if humidity is too low. The unshed layer of skin can build up around the eyes, preventing the lizard from feeding and may lead to starvation. This can be prevented by maintaining high humidity.

Communication 
Anoles use visual cues as their primary signaling mode.

References

External links 

 Brown Anole at Zachary Taylor Beach, Key West, video of Brown Anole displaying courtship behaviour

Anoles
Reptiles described in 1837
Taxa named by André Marie Constant Duméril
Taxa named by Gabriel Bibron
Reptiles of the United States
Reptiles of Cuba
Reptiles of the Bahamas
Reptiles of the Caribbean